Warrenton High School is a secondary school located in Warrenton, United States, in Warren County, Missouri. It is part of the Warren County R-3 School District.  The current building was built in 1996. Prior to that period, the high school was housed in the current Black Hawk Middle School/Daniel Boone Building. Warrenton High School officially had 1006 students enrolled for the 2008-2009 academic year, according to the Missouri Department of Elementary and Secondary Education,.

It was not until 2005 that the school was officially called "Warrenton High School" by the district. Prior to that time there was a very-often-brought-up (and sometimes heated) debate as to whether the school's official name was "Warrenton High School" or "Warren Co. R-3 High School."  This confusion is still present, as MSHSAA officially calls all sports teams "Warren County."  Following the tradition of students, however, district superintendent John Long decided to call the school "Warrenton High School" officially as of '05.

Warrenton High School's colors are red and white. Its mascot is the Warrior.

Warrenton High School is on a 4 day week. It is the second biggest school in Missouri to have adopted it.

Activities
The school offers Softball, Cheerleading, Cross Country, Football, Soccer, Volleyball, Basketball, Wrestling, Dance Team, Baseball, Golf, and Track and Field for athletics, and Marching and Concert bands as well as Color Guard, Choir, Speech and Debate, Math Team, Rotary Interact, Drama Productions which are a fall musical and spring play, and many other various clubs, including FFA, DECA, IMAGINE Higher Education (student-led college preparatory club), FCCLA, Photography Club, International Club, Peer Helpers, FBLA and FCA.

Warrenton is the smallest school in the Gateway Athletic Conference which is made up of schools mostly from St. Charles County. Its largest rival, however, is county foe Wright City High School.

Major Accomplishments 
The Softball team won the school its first state championship in any sport in 2015, they would go on to win the state championship again in 2016.

References and notes

External links
Warrenton H.S.
Warren County R-III School District

Educational institutions established in 1906
High schools in Warren County, Missouri
Public high schools in Missouri
1906 establishments in Missouri